Ronnie Baker may refer to:

Ronnie Baker (athlete) (born 1993), American track and field sprinter
Ronnie Baker (musician) (1947–1990), American soul bass guitar player

See also
Ron Baker (disambiguation)
Ronald Baker (disambiguation)